Tango is a 1969 Bulgarian drama film directed by Vasil Mirchev. It was entered into the 6th Moscow International Film Festival.

Cast
 Nevena Kokanova as Havadzhieva
 Petar Penkov as Prokurorat Yorgov
 Petar Slabakov as Todor
 Stoyan Gudev as Melnicharyat Milan
 Grigor Vachkov as Ilyo Mitovski
 Dimitrina Savova as Kuna
 Nevena Milosheva as Baba Darya
 Georgi Georgiev as Yordan Mitovski
 Ivan Nalbantov as Ivan Proev
 Boris Savov as Boris Yordanov
 Boris Arabow as Havadzhiev

References

External links
 

1969 films
1969 drama films
1960s Bulgarian-language films
Bulgarian black-and-white films
Bulgarian drama films